XHPK-FM is a radio station in Pachuca, broadcasting on 92.5 FM. It is owned by Grupo ACIR and carries its Mix adult contemporary format.

History
XHPK began as XERD-AM 1420, with a concession issued in September 1964 to Corporación Radiofónica de Pachuca, owned by Darío Mondragón González. XERD replaced XEPK-AM, now XERD-AM, on the frequency; the sister station moved to 1190.

In the mid-1990s, XERD and XEPK switched callsigns. In 2011, XEPK migrated to FM as XHPK-FM 92.5.

References

Radio stations in Hidalgo (state)
Radio stations established in 1964
Grupo ACIR